The 2014 season is Ligi Ndogo Sports Club's first year in the Kenyan National Super League and their fourth consecutive season in the second tier of the Kenyan football league system.

The Planets have gone through the lower tiers of the Kenyan football league system and are now one division below the Premier League. The team started in the Nationwide League's Second Division in 2006 before gaining promotion to the First Division in 2007, where they remained until 2013 (the league has since been changed to FKF Division One). During that season, the team finished the season in fourth place, gaining promotion to the newly formed National Super League.

Season overview

January
The team was back on 13 January for pre-season practice, assembling on the grounds for the opening of its annual training camp Monday morning. Last season, the team put together a 12-5-5 record, highlighted by a five match winning streak in November including wins over K.R.A., Mahakama and Bidco United to sprint from sixth to fourth and qualify for Super League football.

The team welcomes back ten starters from last season's side, including the team's leaders in goals (John Njoroge, 12), assists (Samuel Machio, 18), most appearances (Brian Yator, 47) as well as minutes played (Phillip Ugochukwu, 3,060).

Central defender Arthur Weyula was sold to newly promoted Premier League side Top Fry AllStars, while Leonard Ochieng and Edgar Lenox Odhiambo will feature for Provincial League side Kibera All Stars on waiver and loan respectively. Five-year veteran Machio was selected as team captain and will serve in that capacity throughout the 2014 season. Striker Thomas Lugera is back on the roster after going on loan to Coast United during the 2013 season. Right back Mikhail Mwaniki, the longest serving member of the academy, returns to the active roster after sitting out most of the 2013 season due to personal matters.

Ten transfers joined Ligi Ndogo for this season. Among them was Kibera Black Stars centre back Isaac Omari, a replacement for Weyula, two other defenders, three midfielders, two strikers and former Planets keeper, Charles Ouma, who is back after one year at Premier League side Muhoroni Youth.

In keeping with tradition, six players were promoted from the lower Ligi Ndogo teams. Right back Brian Ochieng (23) and goalkeeper Douglas Aswani (20) were promoted from the foundation team, while midfielders Kibet Kilele (17), Kamaru Waiyaki (17) and Remy Sheikh (16) were promoted from the under-17 side that has featured in the Keele International Cup in England over the past five years. A major part of the Planets' title quest this season will depend on the consistency of their back four, a constantly improving unit that conceded only 7 goals in the second half of the season compared to 15 in the first leg.

The team will play its home games at its Ngong Road centre,  where it played its last five matches in the 2013 season with a record of 4-1.

February
The team added one more player from the youth system, Christian Lubulu (19), and dropped two more (Wycliffe Njenga and Eric Kibiru) before the final team hand-over deadline. 2012 top scorer Vincent Okoth returned to the roster and was joined by Clifford Ouma and Obadiah Ndege, who is on loan from Posta Rangers. Brillian Ochieng also returned to the squad, while goalkeeper Tom Muthomi was released to Nairobi Stima.

Ligi Ndogo had its first friendly game against the Academy side and lost 2-1 before bouncing back to beat Iron Strikers 4-0. In a subsequent rematch, it beat the Academy team 1-0. The team played three more pre-season friendlies in anticipation of the start of the National Super League. However, the kick-off was postponed by a week due to a series of new rules that teams had to comply with.

March
On 15 March, the Planets won their first match of the 2014 National Super League and went top of the league in the first week of action. Brian Yator's hat trick pushed his goal tally to eight in seven matches. On 23 March the Planets went down 3-0 to Posta Rangers, their first league defeat by two goals or more since 14 October 2012 (losing 2-0 to Bandari). Goalkeeper Charles Ouma aggravated a knee injury and was ruled out for six weeks.

The Planets held Kariobangi Sharks to a 1-1 draw with a late penalty on 29 March for 4 points in their slowest start after three matches (9 points in 2011 and 7 points in 2012). The match was German tactician Oliver Page's first since taking over the senior team. He had previously joined the Academy as a technical advisor, and he now becomes the Sports Director.

Players

Current squad

Transfers

From the youth system

Transfers in

Transfers out

Club

Coaching staff
{| class="wikitable"
|-
!Position
!Staff
|-
|Head coach           ||  Oliver Page
|-
|Assistant head coach ||  Bernard Ndichu
|-
|Goalkeeper coach     ||  Ken Opiyo
|-
|Fitness coach        ||  John Zane Midambo
|-
|Medical director     ||  Fred Onsakia
|-
|Reserve team coach   ||  Evans Ogutu
|-
|Academy director     ||  Ibrahim Mbikalo
|-
|Youth team manager   ||  Mikhail Mwaniki
|-
|Match analyst        ||  Chris Amimo
|-
|Team administrator   ||  Calvin Odhiambo

Managerial changes

Kit

|
|
|

Competitions
Legend

Overall

|-
| align="left" | National Super League
| –
| 6th
| TBD
| 15 March 2014
| TBA
|-
| align="left" | GOtv Shield
| 2nd round
| –
| 4th round
| 31 May 2014
| 7 September 2014

Pre-season

National Super League

League table

Results summary

Results by round

Matches

GOtv Shield

Mid-season
This is a list of friendlies played during the course of the season.

 Attendance figures are estimates to the nearest 10.

Statistics

Squad statistics

* Repeated numbers are for jerseys shared in different matches.

Goalkeepers

a. Includes the GOtv Shield, Jamhuri Day Cup and Madaraka Day Cup.
b. Tom Muthomi was released after four exhibition matches.

Season statistics

Total appearances and goals

|- align="center"
! colspan="31"| Goalkeepers

|- align="center"
! colspan="31"| Defenders

|- align="center"
! colspan="31"| Midfielders

|- align="center"
! colspan="31"| Forwards

Totals and averages

Records

1  Includes the GOtv Shield, Jamhuri Day Cup and Madaraka Day Cup.

References

2014
Ligi Ndogo